Robin Laing (born 1976) is a Scottish actor, best known for his portrayal of Edward Heffron in the HBO series Band of Brothers (2001) and as DI Donald in River City (2012–17).

Born in Dundee, Laing began acting at a young age, joining an Arbroath theatre company, performing there in productions such as Trainspotting, portraying the character of Renton. He studied Drama at Fife College.

Laing's participation in Band of Brothers led to a friendship with Heffron, whom he played until Heffron's passing in 2013. Laing played Martin Ness in 2004's "Shadowplay", part of Series 4 (episodes 11 and 12) of Waking the Dead.

He joined the cast of River City in 2012, and would appear regularly on it until 2017, and also appeared on Waterloo Road in a recurring role. He is also to appear in season six of Outlander. Other appearances include in the films Filth (2013) and Outlaw King (2018).

Laing resides in Scotland.

Filmography

Film

Television

Radio

References

External links

Robin Laing at the Internet Movie Database

1976 births
Male actors from Dundee
Scottish male radio actors
Living people
Scottish male film actors
Scottish male television actors
Scottish male stage actors